Hiram Rodney Burton (November 13, 1841 – June 17, 1927) was an American physician and politician from Lewes, in Sussex County, Delaware. He was a member of the Republican Party, who served two terms as U. S. Representative from Delaware.

Early life and family
Burton was born in Lewes, Delaware. His mother was Ruth Hunn Rodney. He attended St. Peter's Academy at Lewes, taught for two years in the schools in Sussex County, and engaged in the dry goods business in Washington, D.C. from 1862 until 1865. Burton graduated from the medical department of the University of Pennsylvania in Philadelphia in 1868 and practiced medicine in Frankfort, Delaware from 1868 until 1872, when he moved back to Lewes.

Professional and political career
From 1877 until 1888, Burton was the deputy collector of customs for the port of Lewes and was acting assistant surgeon in the United States Marine Hospital Service from 1890 until 1893. He was an unsuccessful candidate for the State Senate in 1898, and a delegate to the Republican National Convention in 1896, 1900, and 1908;

Burton was elected to the U.S. House of Representatives in 1904 and won election again in 1906. During these terms, he served in the Republican majority in the 59th and 60th Congress. He sought re-election in 1908, but could not get his party's nomination. He served two terms, from March 4, 1905, until March 3, 1909. This was during the administration of U.S. President Theodore Roosevelt. Subsequently, he resumed the practice of medicine in Lewes.

Death and legacy
Burton died at Lewes and is buried in the St. Paul's Episcopal Churchyard at Georgetown. His home at Lewes is owned by the Lewes Historical Society and is open to the public.

Almanac
Elections are held the first Tuesday after November 1. U.S. Representatives took office March 4 and have a two-year term.

References

Images
Hiram Rodney Burton House

External links
Biographical Directory of the United States Congress 
Delaware's Members of Congress

Hiram Rodney Burton House
The Political Graveyard

Places with more information
Delaware Historical Society; website; 505 North Market Street, Wilmington, Delaware 19801; (302) 655-7161
University of Delaware; Library website; 181 South College Avenue, Newark, Delaware 19717; (302) 831-2965
Newark Free Library; 750 Library Ave., Newark, Delaware; (302) 731-7550

1841 births
1927 deaths
American Episcopalians
People from Lewes, Delaware
Perelman School of Medicine at the University of Pennsylvania alumni
Physicians from Delaware
Burials in Sussex County, Delaware
Republican Party members of the United States House of Representatives from Delaware